The Douglas 1211-J was a bomber aircraft design developed by American aircraft manufacturer Douglas to compete with the Boeing B-52 design for a major United States Air Force contract between 1946 and 1954. The Model 1211-J design was 160 feet long with a wingspan of 227 feet, and was powered by four turboprop engines. The aircraft was designed around a new 43,000-pound conventional bomb but could carry nuclear weapons as well. It could also carry its own fighter escorts, as parasites under its wings. These fighters' jet engines were to be powered up to assist the carrier bomber during takeoff; refueling of the fighters was to take place while they were stowed on the mothership's underwing pylons.

Specifications

See also

References

Further reading 
 
 
 

Douglas aircraft
Cancelled military aircraft projects of the United States
Four-engined tractor aircraft
Four-engined turboprop aircraft